The Barisal Division cricket team or Barisal Blazers is a Bangladeshi first-class team representing the Barisal Division, one of the seven administrative regions in Bangladesh. The team competes in the National Cricket League and was formerly a participant in the now-defunct National Cricket League One-Day. In the short-lived National Cricket League Twenty20 competition, played in the 2009–10 season only, Barisal played in their official green and black colors. The equivalent team in the Bangladesh Premier League (BPL) is the Barisal Bulls.

Barisal's home ground is the Barisal Divisional Stadium, also known as the Abdur Rab Serniabad Stadium, which has a 15,000 capacity. They have only won one competition in their history, the 2008–09 National Cricket League One-Day.

Honours
 National Cricket League (0) – 
 One-Day Cricket League (1) – 2008–09

Summary by season

At the end of the 2017–18 season Barisal Division had played 140 first-class matches, with 20 wins, 61 losses and 59 draws.

Current squad
, The current squad for 2019–20 season

Notable players
The following is a list of players who have played for both Barisal and Bangladesh.

 Anisur Rahman
 Habibul Bashar
 Hannan Sarkar
 Harunur Rashid
 Javed Omar
 Mafizur Rahman
 Mazharul Haque
 Mohammad Shariff
 Moniruzzaman
 Mosharraf Hossain
 Nadif Chowdhury
 Nasir Hossain
 Nazimuddin
 Ranjan Das
 Raqibul Hasan
 Robiul Islam
 Sajidul Islam
 Sanwar Hossain
 Shahriar Nafees
 Sohag Gazi
 Syed Rasel
 Talha Jubair
 Ziaur Rahman

Barisal players who have played for countries other than Bangladesh:
  Jeevantha Kulatunga

See also
 National Cricket League of Bangladesh

References

Other source
 Wisden Cricketers Almanack (annual)

External links
 Barisal Division at CricketArchive
 CricInfo team profile

Bangladeshi first-class cricket teams
Barishal Division
Bangladesh National Cricket League
1999 establishments in Bangladesh
Cricket clubs established in 1999